The 2005 season was the Kansas City Chiefs' 36th in the National Football League (NFL), their 46th overall, and their fifth and final season under head coach Dick Vermeil.

The team improved on their 7–9 record from 2004 to a decent 10–6 record, but missed the playoffs for the second consecutive season. The Chiefs became the sixth 10–6 team to fail to qualify for the playoffs since the NFL introduced the wild card.

The Chiefs drafted Derrick Johnson and Dustin Colquitt in the 2005 NFL Draft. Both players would eventually become fan favorites. Johnson would play for the Chiefs until 2017 and Colquitt would play for the team until their Super Bowl championship season in 2019.

The final season of head coach Dick Vermeil was a swan song for one of the NFL's most prolific offensive squads in years, and the breakout season of running back Larry Johnson, who finished the season with 1,750 rushing yards in only nine starts.  After running back Priest Holmes was injured in week 8 against the San Diego Chargers, Johnson took over the reins of the Chiefs’ offense and it almost resulted in a playoff berth.

For the 2005 campaign, the Chiefs brought several new players to boost a defense that has finished among the worst units the past three years. Starting with first draft pick, linebacker Derrick Johnson from the University of Texas, free agent linebacker Kendrell Bell, free agent safety Sammy Knight, and also trading for cornerback Patrick Surtain from the Miami Dolphins for a second-round draft pick, the Chiefs had high hopes for the 2005 season.

Offseason

Speculation on Dick Vermeil's future
Speculation was heavy over the future of coach Dick Vermeil's job in Kansas City for the 2006 season.  Vermeil initially signed on with the Chiefs for three years, but was entering his fifth.  The 69-year-old Vermeil entered the season as the oldest current head coach in the NFL.

Free agents
The Chiefs attempted to bulk up their weak defense with veteran free agents who have proven themselves in the past. With the acquisitions of Kendrell Bell, Sammy Knight, and Patrick Surtain, the Chiefs had high hopes for the 2005 season.

2005 NFL Draft

Staff

Roster

Schedule

Preseason

Regular season

Note: Intra-division opponents are in bold text.

Game summaries

Week 1: vs. New York Jets

Week 2: at Oakland Raiders

Week 3: at Denver Broncos

Week 4: vs. Philadelphia Eagles

Week 6: vs. Washington Redskins

Week 7: at Miami Dolphins

Week 8: at San Diego Chargers

Week 9: vs. Oakland Raiders

Week 10: at Buffalo Bills

Week 11: at Houston Texans

Week 12: vs. New England Patriots

Week 13: vs. Denver Broncos

Week 14: at Dallas Cowboys

Week 15: at New York Giants

Week 16: vs. San Diego Chargers

Week 17: vs. Cincinnati Bengals

Season summary

The Chiefs got off to a 2–0 start, winning their Week 1 home-opener against the New York Jets and then went on the road to beat their division-rival Oakland Raiders. However, they then lost at Invesco Field at Mile High 10–30 to the Denver Broncos, another division rival. Then in Week 4, the Chiefs hosted the Philadelphia Eagles. Kansas City got off to a fast start and led 24–13 at halftime. However, the Eagles managed to come back and beat the Chiefs, the latter of which would lose the game, 37–31. The Chiefs used their Bye Week in Week 5 to regroup, and managed to win at home against the Washington Redskins, 28–21.

The Chiefs had little time to celebrate because they were informed that because Hurricane Wilma was going to impact Miami on Sunday; they would have to face the Dolphins two days earlier. Despite the sudden change of the schedule, the Chiefs managed to win against the Miami Dolphins 30–20. However, despite having over a week to prepare, they couldn't defeat the San Diego Chargers on the road and lost 28–20. The Chiefs would rebound at home and win a well-fought rematch with their arch-rivals, the Oakland Raiders, with a final of 27–23. However, the Chiefs' next game would not fare as well, as they ended losing the Buffalo Bills, despite outgaining them in yards from scrimmage.

Running back Priest Holmes was injured in the Week 8 matchup against the San Diego Chargers.  Holmes was injured by Chargers rookie linebacker Shawne Merriman and suffered severe head and neck trauma.  Larry Johnson entered the game and claimed the starting position for the remainder of the season, an event which would eventually lead to Johnson's selection in the 2006 Pro Bowl.

The Chiefs would then proceed to start a three-game winning streak going. First, they would beat the 1–8 Houston Texans on Sunday night and then they would win back-to-back home games against the two-time defending champion New England Patriots and then a win over the Denver Broncos. In the following weeks, the Chiefs had a huge disadvantage with back-to-back interconference road losses to the Dallas Cowboys and the New York Giants. 

Chiefs owner Lamar Hunt was honored before the Week 14 game against the Dallas Cowboys and had the honors of the pre-game coin-flip.  Hunt was recognized for his contributions to the City of Dallas, and his establishment of the American Football League's Dallas Texans (now the Kansas City Chiefs), one of the Cowboys’ AFL rivals.

The Chiefs were able to keep their very slim playoff hopes alive after a 20–7 home victory over the San Diego Chargers in week 16. In Week 17, even though the Chiefs got a blowout win at home against the Cincinnati Bengals 37–3, the Steelers won against the Lions 35–21, taking AFC Wild Card #2 and ending the Chiefs' chances of getting into the playoffs. The Steelers eventually won Super Bowl XL, becoming the first sixth-seeded team to play in and win the Super Bowl.

On December 31, 2005, Dick Vermeil announced at a team meeting of his intention to retire following the season. The news leaked out of the team meeting and national news sources began reporting it. The following day, the Chiefs soundly defeated the Cincinnati Bengals, who were already heading to the playoffs, with a final score of 37–3.  With the clock winding down on the game and Vermeil's coaching career, Vermeil was met with enormous applause and chanting of "one more year."  Vermeil received a Gatorade bath from Lional Dalton and Jared Allen for his final game.

Standings

References

External links
2005 Kansas City Chiefs on Database Football

Kansas City Chiefs
Kansas City Chiefs seasons
Kansas